South Carolina Highway 184 (SC 184) is a  state highway in the U.S. state of South Carolina. The highway connects the Georgia state line and the Ware Shoals area, via Antreville, Due West, and Donalds.

Route description
SC 184 begins at the Georgia state line, where the roadway crosses over the Savannah River and enters that state on the Sgt. Fred M. Newton Bridge as Georgia State Route 368 (Anderson Highway). It begins to travel through Anderson in an east-northeast direction and then curves to the north-northwest before an intersection with SC 187. It curves to the northeast and crosses over Little Generostee Creek before entering Iva. The highway turns right onto Hamilton Street. It has a concurrency with SC 81. At East Green Street, it meets the southern terminus of SC 413. The two highways travel concurrently to the southeast for one block, where SC 413 splits off onto East Front Street. SC 184 then travels to the northeast, leaves Iva, and crosses East Beards Creek. It starts heading east, and crosses over Lake Secession, into Abbeville County, on an unnamed bridge. It then travels through part of Lake Secession and curves to the southeast before entering Antreville. There, it begins a concurrency with SC 28/SC 284. Right after leaving the city limits, SC 284 leaves the concurrency. Approximately  later, SC 184 splits off to the northeast and crosses over Spur Creek. It winds its way through rural areas of the county and crosses over Johnson Creek. A short distance later is an intersection with SC 201 and a crossing of the Little River. SC 184 crosses over Hogskin Creek and Chickasaw Creek before entering Due West. In town, it begins a concurrency with SC 20/SC 185 (Anderson Drive). The three highways pass by Erskine Theological Seminary and Erskine College. At College Street, SC 20/SC 185 splits off, while SC 184 continues to the northeast. In Donalds, it has a very brief concurrency with U.S. Route 178 (US 178). Farther to the northeast, it crosses over Turkey Creek before it meets its eastern terminus, an intersection with SC 252.

Major intersections

See also

References

External links

SC 184 South Carolina Highway Annex

184
Transportation in Anderson County, South Carolina
Transportation in Abbeville County, South Carolina